Gunn is a 1967 American neo noir mystery film directed by Blake Edwards, and starring Craig Stevens, based on the 1958-1961 television series Peter Gunn. Stevens was the only regular cast member
from the original series to appear in the film; the characters of Gunn's singing girlfriend Edie Hart, club owner "Mother", and police lieutenant Jacoby were all recast for the film.  The movie was intended to be the first in a projected series of Peter Gunn feature films, but no sequels followed.

Plot
A gangster named Scarlotti once saved private detective Peter Gunn's life, but now Scarlotti's been killed, and Fusco intends to take over the town's crime syndicate. Gunn and Lt. Jacoby are convinced that Fusco himself must be behind it.

Gunn makes a visit to Mother's, the nightclub, and talks to Mother.  Afterward, he has a romantic interlude with Edie but is interrupted to pay a visit to Daisy Jane, owner of The Ark floating brothel. She hires Gunn to find out who the killer is. When Gunn returns to his apartment, much to his consternation he finds Samantha "Sam" who tries to seduce him. Even worse, Edie and a hitman appear at the same time.

Gunn contacts his informants, and after more killings, he and Jacoby descend upon Fusco who seems obviously guilty. Fusco denies it in front of the two, and in a later beating of Gunn, he denies it again, giving a deadline to Gunn—to solve the murder or end up dead himself.

Cast
 Craig Stevens as Peter Gunn
 Laura Devon as Edie Hart, lounge singer and Peter's girlfriend
 Edward Asner as Lieutenant Charles Jacoby, a police detective and friend of Gunn
 Albert Paulsen as Fusco, underworld kingpin
 Helen Traubel as Mother, owner of the nightclub, Mother's
 Regis Toomey as the Bishop, an informant
 J. Pat O'Malley as Tinker, an informant
 Sherry Jackson as Samantha ("Sam")
 Jerry Douglas as Dave Corwin
 Marion Marshall as Daisy Jane
 Carol Wayne as Ernestine ("Ernie")

Production
William Friedkin recalled that he met Blake Edwards in September 1966.  Edwards told him he was considering a return of the Peter Gunn television show but would begin by making a Peter Gunn feature film. Edwards told Friedkin that Charles Bludhorn, the new head of Paramount thought Lola Albright "too old" to resume her former role and instead wanted an Austrian actress who Edwards rejected.  Edwards wanted Friedkin to direct the film but Friedkin thought William Peter Blatty's script was awful, explaining the script was like some of the old television episodes cobbled together rather than something new and exciting. Edwards directed the film himself. Blatty was impressed by Friedkin's honesty and asked him to direct The Exorcist (1973). Edwards' film was originally titled—but then only advertised as—Gunn...Number One!; no sequels followed.

As for the above comment that the script was like some of the old television episodes cobbled together, the film Gunn borrows heavily from the Peter Gunn series' pilot, the season 1 episode 1, "The Kill" (mobster's death by fake Coast Guard vs fake police, burial, romantic interlude, meeting at racquetball court, bombing at Mother's), and lifts sequences from three other episodes (girl in Gunn's apartment - "The Briefcase" - season 2, episode 12; chase through the boatyard - "Hollywood Calling" - season 2, episode 22; talking to an informant - "Death Is a Four Letter Word" - season 3, episode 34).

Sherry Jackson tells how she was hired for the movie, "A friend took me to lunch in the noisy Paramount commissary while I was wearing the costume [from the Star Trek episode, "What Little Girls Are Made Of"]. I’m terribly near-sighted and when we walked in, it got quieter and quieter, so I asked what was happening. Turns out, they were all looking at me. All the seats were full, so we got a table in the director’s room where Blake Edwards happened to be sitting. My friend told me he began pointing to me and giving hand signals to Craig Stevens in another part of the room and yelling to him ‘Sam! Sam!’ That turned out to be a character in Edwards’ next film, ‘Gunn,’ and I was offered the part.”

She continues, "But Paramount knew it was not going to be a big hit, so they wanted to use me to promote it.”

According to Herbert F. Solow, Paramount executive, he recalled that Sherry Jackson's friend who led her into the commissary was Star Trek actor William Shatner.

Although the complete Peter Gunn television series is available on VHS and DVD, the film version of Gunn has never been issued on home video in any format, though pirate DVDs of the movie are available, copied from the pan-and-scan Netflix version that has its credits in French. The widescreen version is not available.

Trivia
In the TV series, Peter Gunn drives Chrysler Corp. convertibles.  In this movie, he drives a 1967 Ford Thunderbird hardtop.

Playing the part of Daisy Jane in this movie, Marion Marshall was a veteran of the Peter Gunn t.v. show, having been in the season 1 episode, "The Chinese Hangman," playing the part of Joanna Lund.

Reprising his role as a well-spoken though tipsy informant, J. Pat O'Malley guest-stars as Tinker; he played the essentially same character in the Peter Gunn series' season 2 episode, "The Price is Murder", as Pithias, and in the season 3 episode, "Death Is a Four Letter Word", as Luther.

The only movie songs that originated in the t.v. series are "Peter Gunn" and "Dreamsville".

Julie Andrews mentions in her book, "Home Work", that her husband, Blake Edwards, had collaborated with William Peter Blatty in writing several films, including Gunn.

Music
Director Blake Edwards said, "As I entered the first scoring session of our new "Gunn" film, I was delighted to see that the band contained most of the familiar faces that had done the original TV show."

"Hank (Henry Mancini) and I had discussed the music for the "Gunn" film thoroughly, and he confessed to me that this was to be one of his most difficult assignments.  The six years that had passed since the TV 'Peter Gunn' went off the air had seen sweeping changes, not only in jazz, but in all phases of the pop music spectrum."

"As the score unfolded, everyone on that scoring stage agreed that Hank had done what was needed -- he had brought 'Peter Gunn' up to date without sacrificing the feel and excitement of the original.  I think you will agree."

In 1967, RCA Victor released, “Gunn ...Number One!”, Music from the Motion Picture Score Composed and Conducted by Henry Mancini.  It was recorded at RCA Victor’s "Music Center of the World" studios in Hollywood, California.

The soundtrack CD, "Gunn ...Number One!", was released by RCA/BMG Music Spain, S.A. in 1999.

Listed on the credits, the featured soloists are: Pete Carroll, trumpet; Dick Nash, trombone; Plas Johnson, Selmer varitone electric sax; Vincent De Rosa, French horn; Ted Nash, alto and baritone sax, flute; Bud Shank, baritone sax; Bob Bain, guitar; Jimmy Rowles, piano; Ray Brown, bass; Shelly Manne, drums; and Larry Bunker, vibes.

Below are the movie song title, durations, and the credited soloists:

Song titles
 "Peter Gunn"  – 2:05—Plas Johnson
 "A Quiet Happening"  – 3:05—Ted Nash, Bud Shank, Ray Brown
 "Dreamsville"  – 3:46—Larry Bunker, Vincent De Rosa
 "Sky Watch"  – 3:22—Larry Bunker, Jimmy Rowles, Pete Candoli, Ted Nash
 "A Bluish Bag"  – 2:53
 "Theme for Sam"  – 3:10—Jimmy Rowles
 "The Monkey Farm"  – 2:23—Bob Bain, Ted Nash, Plas Johnson
 "A Lovely Sound"  – 3:32—Dick Nash
 "I Like the Look"  – 2:39—Ray Brown, Shelly Manne
 "Silver Tears"  – 3:31—Larry Bunker, Bob Bain
 "Sweet!"  – 3:06—Larry Bunker, Pete Candoli, Dick Nash
 "Night Owl" - 3:47—Ted Nash
 "Bye Bye" - 2:08—Shelly Manne

Notes

External links 
 
 
 

1967 films
1960s crime films
American detective films
Films directed by Blake Edwards
Films based on television series
Paramount Pictures films
Films with screenplays by William Peter Blatty
Films scored by Henry Mancini
American neo-noir films
Films with screenplays by Blake Edwards
1960s English-language films
1960s American films